The Taça de Portugal de Futsal Feminino is the main Portuguese national women's futsal knock-out competition.

It was created in 2013–14 season and is organized by the Portuguese Football Federation. The current holders are Benfica, who have won a record 4 trophies, 3 of them consecutively.

Taça de Portugal finals

Performance by club

External links
Official website
Magiadofutsal (archived)

Futsal
Futsal competitions in Portugal
Sports leagues established in 2013
2013 establishments in Portugal
Women's football competitions in Portugal